The 1975 European Tour was a series of golf tournaments that comprised the Professional Golfers' Association (PGA) Tournament Players’ Section circuit. It is officially recognised as the fourth season of the PGA European Tour.

Historically, the PGA's Order of Merit only included tournaments in Great Britain and Ireland, but in 1970 events in continental Europe were included for the first time. The circuit and organisation evolved further over the following years, adopting the name PGA European Golf Tour in 1979.

The season was made up of 19 tournaments counting for the Order of Merit, and some non-counting tournaments that later became known as "Approved Special Events". The schedule included the major national opens around Europe, with the other tournaments mostly held in England and Scotland.

The Order of Merit was won by South Africa's Dale Hayes.

Changes for 1975
There were several changes from the previous season, with the addition of the Carroll's Irish Open, which replaced the Carroll's International, and the Kerrygold International Classic; and the loss of the Penfold Tournament, the W.D. & H.O. Wills Tournament and the El Paraiso Open. Following the withdrawal of sponsors, Lord Derby's Young Professionals' Tournament and the Coca-Cola Young Professionals' Championship were also lost from the schedule, the PGA ultimately decided to sponsor an under-25's event themselves.

Schedule
The following table lists official events during the 1975 season.

Unofficial events
The following events were sanctioned by the European Tour, but did not carry official money, nor were wins official.

Order of Merit
The Order of Merit was based on prize money won during the season, calculated using a points-based system.

See also
List of golfers with most European Tour wins

Notes

References

External links
1975 season results on the PGA European Tour website
1975 Order of Merit on the PGA European Tour website

European Tour seasons
European Tour